An Environmental Literacy Plan (ELP) refers to a state education plan to teach about how ecosystems and human systems are interdependent, particularly, how the consumption choices human beings make alter their ability to live sustainably. ELP’s serve as a central component of the No Child Left Inside movement (NCLI) of 2008 which the House of Representatives passed on September 18, 2008. As outlined by the NCLI of 2008, ELP’s must contain numerous and explicit provisions. The North American Association for Environmental Education (NAAEE) condenses NCLI act into five components which allow states to become eligibile for funds allocated through the NCLI act. 

The purpose of an ELP is to create a comprehensive education plan for environmental literacy that can be evaluated on the basis of student learning outcomes. the NCLI legislation defines goals as follows. Advancing content and achievement standards, Developing or disseminating innovations or model programs, Research, particularly on integrating environmental education in the study of other subjects
and Capacity-building measures to increase the number of elementary and secondary environmental education teachers.

Definition 
 Environmental literacy is an individual understanding of how our local environments and the world at large are affected by the way we obtained resources.An Environmental Literacy Plan (ELP) refers to a state education plan to teach about how ecosystems and human systems are interdependent, particularly, how the consumption choices human beings make alter their ability to live sustainably. ELP’s serve as a central component of the 2008 No Child Left Inside movement (NCLI) which the House of Representatives passed.

State standards, content areas, and courses or subjects 

Environmental Literacy Plan’s include environmental literacy content standards in grades Pre-K through 12th grade. Curriculum integration of the environmental literacy standards into the curriculum occur through content integration or as standalone topics of learning. "Attention should be paid to mandated learning outcomes and curriculum content, standardized tests, and instructional syllabuses".  Clear and supported learning standards are required to ensure high school graduates possess a determined degree of environmental literacy.

High school graduation requirements 
One component of an ELP is the consideration of how environmental literacy will be incorporated into the state’s graduation requirement. Hence high school courses should be aligned with the topic of environmental literacy, programming opportunities for students should be offered or credits for environmental literacy should be a requirement for graduation.

Professional development 

The ELP provides provisions for both pre-service and in-service teacher preparation. Teacher preparation within the field of environmental literacy will need to support learning using place-based and experiential learning strategies. "The work of reorienting teachers education for the values of sustainability is crucial to creating a new understanding of ourselves and our place in communities, in the living world and in traditions of relational reciprocity that will sustain us all".

Assessment of environmental literacy 
The initial ELP should contain a detailed description of how the state education agency will assess and measure the learning achieved through the implementation of the ELP. The assessment of environmental literacy of students will measure the extent to which the ELP was successful.

Implementation and support 
Key logistical and implementation issues will be addressed within the ELP. One of the most essential components of the ELP is planning for future funding and support. As designated by the NCLI act of 2008 funding tampers off after the initial year of implementation and eventually reduces to 50% of total program expenses. The ELP outlines and anticipates future sources of funding for the state environmental literacy program. The ELP also considers how federal and state education-related legislation and initiatives such as IDEA or STEM funding will be integrated into the overall environmental literacy program.

References

Bibliography 
 Berkowitz, Alan. "New Opportunities for ecology education in the United States." In Ecology in education. Cambridge [England: Cambridge University Press, 1993. 55.
 "Environmental Literacy Plans by State." NCLI. http://www.cbf.org/ncli/action/environmental-literacy-plans-by-state (accessed March 6, 2014). 
 "Guidelines for Excellence ." Posts. https://web.archive.org/web/20140310023808/http://eelinked.naaee.net/n/guidelines (accessed February 28, 2014). 
 "H.R. 3036 (110th): No Child Left Inside Act of 2008." GovTrack.us. https://www.govtrack.us/congress/bills/110/hr3036#overview (accessed March 6, 2014).
 Howard, Patrick . "Who Will Teach the Teachers?." In Teaching sustainability, teaching sustainably. Sterling, Va.: Stylus Pub., 2012. 156. 
 North American Association for Environmental Education. Developing a State Environmental Literacy Plan, Washington D.C. 2008 
 "Posts." Posts. https://web.archive.org/web/20140310023746/http://eelinked.naaee.net/n/elp (accessed March 6, 2014).
 "Proposed Idaho Environmental Literacy Plan." Idaho Environmental Education Association 1 (2010): 26.
 "Welcome to NAAEE | NAAEE." Welcome to NAAEE | NAAEE. http://www.naaee.net/ (accessed March 7, 2014).

Environmentalism
Environmental education
Sustainability in the United States